The Yin was a short-lived kingdom during China's Five Dynasties and Ten Kingdoms period which lasted from 907 to 960 and bridged the time between the fall of the Tang Dynasty and the foundation of the Song Dynasty.

Rebellion from Min
The Min kingdom was founded in 909 after the Tang Dynasty collapsed.  However, after the founder of the kingdom, Wang Shenzhi, died in 925, the sons squabbled with one another.  In 943, that led to an all out rebellion as one of Wang Shenzhi's sons, Wang Yanzheng, rebelled and carved out the Yin Kingdom out of the northwestern part of the Min kingdom.

Territorial extent
The Yin kingdom was rather small, occupying an area in present-day northern Fujian and southern Zhejiang.  It was bounded by Wuyue to the north, Min to the south and east and the Southern Tang to the west.

End of Yin as separate entity 
In 944, Wang Yanzheng's brother and rival as the Emperor of Min, Wang Yanxi, was assassinated.  Wang Yanxi's general Zhu Wenjin claimed the Min throne.  In 945, Zhu was assassinated, and his army pledged allegiance to Wang Yanzheng as the Emperor of Min and asked him to return to the Min capital Changle.  Wang Yanzheng claimed the Min throne, ending Yin's existence as a separate state, but did not return to Changle; rather, he remained at his base of Jian Prefecture, which Southern Tang besieged later in the year, forcing his surrender.

Ruler

References

Five Dynasties and Ten Kingdoms
Former countries in Chinese history
940s establishments
10th-century establishments in China
940s disestablishments
10th-century disestablishments in China
States and territories established in the 940s
States and territories disestablished in the 940s
940s